Gregor Haloander (born as Gregor Meltzer; 1501 – 7 September 1531) was a German legal scholar. He authored a recension of the Digest of Roman law.

Works 
 
 
Nearon Ioustinianou biblion, 1531.

References
 

1501 births
1531 deaths
16th-century German lawyers